DoReMi Market, also known as Amazing Saturday, is a South Korean television program that airs on tvN. The program airs every Saturday at 19:30 (KST).

Colour Marking (for Song Dictation only)

Episodes (2018)

Episodes (2019)

Episodes (2020)

Episodes (2021)

Episodes (2022)

Episodes (2023)

Notes

References

Lists of variety television series episodes
Lists of South Korean television series episodes